Dukhless 2 sometimes referred to as Soulless 2, is a 2015 Russian drama film directed by Roman Prygunov, sequel to Dukhless.

Plot
Escaping criminal prosecution in Russia, former bank executive manager Maxim Andreev (Danila Kozlovsky) lives in Bali, surfing and enjoying the sun and the ocean. Once he saves a life for an amateur surfer, who turns out to be the young head of the Russian state corporation that finances innovation. In gratitude, Roman (Miloš Biković) offers Max a job in Moscow. When news of this leaks, representatives of the Russian special services who are seeking compromising evidence against the state corporation, seek the expulsion of Andreev to Russia and demand from him that he accepts Roman's proposal and gather material on his boss. Since otherwise he faces a prison, Max reluctantly becomes a "snitch" and again plunges into the world of Moscow's glamor.

Cast
Danila Kozlovsky as Max Andreev
Mariya Andreyeva as Yulia
Miloš Biković as Roman Belkin
Pavel Vorozhtsov as Savelov
Aleksandra Bortich as Alyona
Kristina Babushkina as Oksana Maslova
Sergey Burunov as Shokhin
Lev Prygunov as Mikhail Ivanovich
Vladimir Simonov as Varennikov
Dominique Pinon as Bernard
Alexey Fedkin as Beroyev
Dmitry Podnozov as Viktor Ilyich
Lyubov Sokolinskaya as Irina Tsifinovets
Ivan Shishkin as Viktor
Tatyana Kazantseva as Tatyana, secretary
Anatoly Dzivaev as Galaktion
Parulian Panggabean as Indonesia Policeman

Production
The film was shot in Bali and Moscow.

Awards
Danila Kozlovsky won the Nika Award as best actor in 2016.

References

External links

Russian drama films
2015 drama films
2015 films
Films shot in Moscow
Films shot in Indonesia
Russian sequel films
Films produced by Fyodor Bondarchuk